KJCV may refer to:

 KJCV (AM), a radio station (1450 AM) licensed to Jackson, Wyoming, United States
 KJCV-FM, a radio station (89.7 FM) licensed to Country Club, Missouri, United States